Tonga competed at the 2011 World Aquatics Championships in Shanghai, China between July 16 and 31, 2011.

Swimming

Tonga qualified 2 swimmers.

Men

References

Nations at the 2011 World Aquatics Championships
2011 in Tongan sport
Tonga at the World Aquatics Championships